Stephen F. Mayer (February 4, 1854 – August 3, 1935) was an American businessman and politician.

Born in West Bend, Wisconsin, Mayer went to the West Bend public schools and took a commercial course at the University of Notre Dame. Mayer was in the brewery industry. He was also president of the West Bend Aluminum Company. Mayer served on the West Bend village board and on the West Bend school board. He also served on the Washington County, Wisconsin Board of Supervisors and was the president of the county board. Mayer served as county treasurer and was a Democrat. From 1895 to 1899, Mayer served in the Wisconsin State Senate. Mayer died of heart disease at his home in West Bend, Wisconsin.

Notes

1854 births
1935 deaths
People from West Bend, Wisconsin
University of Notre Dame alumni
Businesspeople from Wisconsin
County supervisors in Wisconsin
Wisconsin city council members
School board members in Wisconsin
Democratic Party Wisconsin state senators